Sadvidya Educational Institutions is one of the leading educational institutions in Mysore, Karnataka, India, providing education in the languages English, Kannada, Hindi and Sanskrit. It is located in the heart of Mysore city.
It is one of the city's oldest institutions, established in 1854 by Periswamy Thirumalacharya as an elementary school. Gunja Narasimhaiah gifted the building and the then Maharaja of Mysore, Chamaraja Wadiyar, laid the foundation stone. Swami Vivekananda stayed at the pathashala from 9 to 24 November 1892. Swami Vivekananda camped at the school for two weeks before leaving to the U.S. to participate in the Parliament of World Religions. There is a plaque at Sadvidya Pathashala.

The centenary celebrations of the pathashala were held in 1972 and it was decided to start a high school following which the Sadvidya High School was opened in 1973–74, and in 1999 the Sadvidya Composite Pre-university College was added to provide tertiary education.
Recently, Sadvidya Semi-Residential College has also been launched.

The institution is well known in the city for its SSLC and II PUC Pass rates and its students top the CET Karnataka every year on a consistent basis. To get entry into the school for High School or Pre-University is very tough and highly competitive. The school competes fiercely with its neighbouring school Marimallappa High School for best results in SSLC every year.

References

High schools and secondary schools in Mysore
1854 establishments in India
Educational institutions established in 1854